Svengali is a 1927 German silent drama film directed by Gennaro Righelli and starring Paul Wegener, Anita Dorris and André Mattoni. It was produced and written by Max Glass, an adaptation of the 1894 George du Maurier novel Trilby. This is one of the adaptations of the novel that shifts the focus of the story more to Svengali, since at this time anti-Semitism was on the rise in Germany, and Svengali was portrayed as an evil Jew in the film.

German actress Anita Dorris appeared in very few other silent films, none of which are well known today. Italian director Righelli on the other hand directed numerous films during his career, although his main claim to fame today is that he was the grandfather of Italian horror film director Sergio Martino. Svengali was remade in 1931 as a sound film starring John Barrymore.

Plot
A pretty young artist's model named Trilby falls under the spell of a mesmerist named Svengali who turns her into a leading opera singer with no will of her own. German horror film star Paul Wegener plays Svengali, who uses hypnosis to enslave the beautiful young Trilby, preventing her marriage to her fiancée even though he cannot make her love him. The strain of controlling her and shaping her into an opera star takes a toll on both of them, and when Svengali dies suddenly, Trilby inexplicably dies with him.

Cast
 Paul Wegener as Svengali 
 Anita Dorris as Trilby 
 André Mattoni as Billy (artist)
 Teddy Bill as Leard (artist)
 Hans Brausewetter as Taffy (artist)
 Paul Biensfeldt as Martine (model)
 Alexander Granach as Geiger Gecko 
 Alice Torning as Martine's wife
 Hertha von Walther as Sascha (dancer) 
 Irma Green as Student
 Hermann Picha as Landlord of cafe
 Emil Heyse

Production
It was shot at the Terra Studios in Berlin with sets designed by the art director Hans Jacoby. Svengali had previously been filmed in 1914 as an Austrian film directed by Luise Kolm and Jacob Fleck. There were also three notable earlier silent film versions of Trilby...Trilby (1914 film), Trilby (1915 film), and again Trilby (1923 film).

Bibliography
 Isenberg, Noah. Weimar Cinema: An Essential Guide to Classic Films of the Era. Columbia University Press, 2009.

References

External links

1927 films
Films of the Weimar Republic
German silent feature films
German drama films
Films directed by Gennaro Righelli
Films based on British novels
Films based on works by George du Maurier
Terra Film films
1927 drama films
Films about hypnosis
Trilby (novel)
German black-and-white films
Silent drama films
Films shot at Terra Studios
1920s German films
Antisemitic films
Antisemitism in Germany